Gerald "Gerry" Weiner,  (born June 26, 1933) is a Canadian politician.

A pharmacist educated at McGill University and the Université de Montréal, Weiner entered local politics and eventually became mayor of Dollard-des-Ormeaux, Quebec in 1982. He was a Progressive Conservative candidate in the 1984 election, winning a seat in the House of Commons of Canada as Member of Parliament for Dollard, Quebec in the Tory landslide that brought Brian Mulroney to power.

After serving for two years as a parliamentary secretary, Weiner was promoted to Prime Minister Mulroney's Cabinet as Minister of State for immigration. In 1988, he became Minister of State for Multiculturalism, and served in that position until 1991.

He was re-elected as MP for the new riding of Pierrefonds—Dollard in the 1988 election. In 1989, he became Secretary of State for Canada. From 1990 to 1993, he was Minister of Multiculturalism and Citizenship in the cabinets of Mulroney and his successor Kim Campbell. He lost his seat in the 1993 election that also defeated the Campbell government and reduced the Tories to two seats.

Weiner entered provincial politics, serving as president of the Equality Party, which was a party advocating the rights of anglophones in Quebec. In 1998, he was elected to the city council in Montreal as a member of the Vision Montreal party and a supporter of Mayor Pierre Bourque. Weiner served on the city's executive committee.

More recently, Weiner has returned to the private sector as an executive director of APS Global Partners. Weiner continues to practice as a pharmacist in Montreal. He is currently the president of the board of directors for The Centre For Literacy of Quebec; the national vice-president of the  Friends of Haifa University; the chair of the board of directors of the Old Port of Montreal Corporation; a member board of directors of Mount Sinai Hospital and member of the board of directors of the Canada-India Business Council.

Electoral record

References

External links
 

1933 births
Anglophone Quebec people
Canadian pharmacists
Living people
Mayors of places in Quebec
People from Dollard-des-Ormeaux
McGill University Faculty of Science alumni
Members of the 24th Canadian Ministry
Members of the 25th Canadian Ministry
Members of the House of Commons of Canada from Quebec
Members of the King's Privy Council for Canada
Politicians from Montreal
Progressive Conservative Party of Canada MPs
Université de Montréal alumni
Jewish mayors of places in Canada